Patusari is a village situated southeast of the town of Jhunjhunu in Jhunjhunu district, Rajasthan, India.

Villages in Jhunjhunu district